The men's road race at the 1927 UCI Road World Championships was the inaugural edition of the professional event. The race took place on Thursday 21 July 1927 in Adenau, Germany. The race was won by Alfredo Binda of Italy.

Final classification

Notes

References

Men's Road Race
UCI Road World Championships – Men's road race